Survivor Spain is the Spanish version of the popular reality series Survivor. This version of the show has aired on Spanish broadcast channels Telecinco, from 2000 to 2001 and 2006 to the present, Antena 3, from 2003 to 2005, and on laSiete from 2009 to 2014.

Throughout its time on air in Spain, Survivor has gone by many names. From 2000 to 2001 it was known as Supervivientes: Expedicion Robinson, a show that closely followed the American version of the program. From 2003 to 2004 it was known as La isla de los FamoS.O.S, which, unlike its previous incarnation, resembled more of a Big Brother format and included celebrities as contestants (this format would be carried over to all future versions of the show). In 2005, it was known as Aventura en África and since 2006 it has been called simply Supervivientes.

Format and rules 

Spanish Survivor followed the format of the American Survivor initially.

Aside from its original format, all subsequent versions of the Spanish Survivor have followed a different set of rules that have included a public vote, nominations, evictions, and a winner chosen by the public. The prize for the winner has varied from season to season depending on the show's current format.

Spanish Survivor seasons

Telecinco

Antena 3

Pasaporte a la isla
Pasaporte a la isla (English:Passport to the island), is a reality TV contest broadcast on Telecinco and produced by Magnolia. A spin-off of Supervivientes, the prize is a spot to participate in Supervivientes 2016.

External links
 (Official Site) 

Survivor (franchise)
2000 Spanish television series debuts
Spanish reality television series